ITOS-E was a weather satellite operated by the National Oceanic and Atmospheric Administration (NOAA). It was part of a series of satellites called ITOS, or improved TIROS. ITOS-E was released on July 16, 1973, from the Vandenberg Air Force Base, California, with a Delta rocket, but failed to achieve orbit.

References 

1973 in spaceflight
Spacecraft launched by Delta rockets
Weather satellites of the United States